Diplodia is a genus of anamorphic fungi in the family Botryosphaeriaceae.

Species

Diplodia abiegna
Diplodia abrotani
Diplodia abutilonis
Diplodia acaciae
Diplodia acaciarum
Diplodia acanthophylli
Diplodia acericola
Diplodia acerina
Diplodia aceris
Diplodia acervata
Diplodia acicola
Diplodia aconiti
Diplodia acori
Diplodia actinonema
Diplodia adelinensis
Diplodia adenocarpi
Diplodia adhatodae
Diplodia adolinensis
Diplodia aegyptiaca
Diplodia aegyptica
Diplodia aesculi
Diplodia africana
Diplodia agaves
Diplodia agni-casti
Diplodia agrifolia
Diplodia agrostidis
Diplodia ailanthi
Diplodia ailanthina
Diplodia akebiae
Diplodia alaterni
Diplodia albotecta
Diplodia albozonata
Diplodia alhagi
Diplodia allocellula
Diplodia alni
Diplodia alni-rubrae
Diplodia aloysiae
Diplodia althaeae
Diplodia amaranthi
Diplodia amelanchieris
Diplodia ammodendri
Diplodia ampelina
Diplodia ampelodesmi
Diplodia ampelopidis
Diplodia ampelopsidis
Diplodia amphisphaerioides
Diplodia amygdali
Diplodia andamensis
Diplodia andicola
Diplodia andrachnes
Diplodia androsaemi
Diplodia annonae
Diplodia annonicola
Diplodia anomala
Diplodia anthophila
Diplodia antiqua
Diplodia aparines
Diplodia apiospora
Diplodia apiosporioides
Diplodia aquifolia
Diplodia arachidis
Diplodia arachnoidea
Diplodia araucariae
Diplodia arctii
Diplodia arecae
Diplodia arecina
Diplodia arengocarpa
Diplodia argentina
Diplodia argyreiae
Diplodia aristolochiae
Diplodia aristolochiae-siphoriis
Diplodia arthrophylli
Diplodia artocarpi
Diplodia artocarpina
Diplodia arundinacea
Diplodia asclepiadea
Diplodia ascochytoides
Diplodia ascochytula
Diplodia asparagi
Diplodia asrocaryi
Diplodia assumptionis
Diplodia asterigmatica
Diplodia asterisci
Diplodia astragali
Diplodia astrocaryi
Diplodia astrodauci
Diplodia atlantica
Diplodia atra
Diplodia atramentaria
Diplodia atrata
Diplodia atrobrunnea
Diplodia atrocoerulea
Diplodia atropae
Diplodia aucubae
Diplodia aucubciola
Diplodia aucubicola
Diplodia auerswaldii
Diplodia aurantii
Diplodia australiae
Diplodia australis
Diplodia auwata
Diplodia baccaridicola
Diplodia baccaridis
Diplodia baccharidicola
Diplodia baccharidis
Diplodia bacchi
Diplodia bambusae
Diplodia bambusina
Diplodia barringtoniae
Diplodia bauhiniae
Diplodia beckii
Diplodia benzoina
Diplodia berberidina
Diplodia berberidis
Diplodia berkeleyi
Diplodia bessimyanii
Diplodia betae
Diplodia beticola
Diplodia betulae
Diplodia bignoniae
Diplodia biparasitica
Diplodia boldoae
Diplodia bombacina
Diplodia borealis
Diplodia bougainvilleae
Diplodia boyeri
Diplodia brachypodii
Diplodia brachyspora
Diplodia brassicae
Diplodia bresadolae
Diplodia briardii
Diplodia broussonetiae
Diplodia bryoniae
Diplodia buddlejae
Diplodia bulbicola
Diplodia bumeliae
Diplodia buteae
Diplodia butleri
Diplodia buxella
Diplodia buxi
Diplodia buxicola
Diplodia cacti
Diplodia cactorum
Diplodia caerulescens
Diplodia caesii
Diplodia caespitosa
Diplodia caffra
Diplodia cajani
Diplodia calamagrostidis
Diplodia calami
Diplodia calamicola
Diplodia calaminthae
Diplodia calecutiana
Diplodia calligoni
Diplodia calotropidis
Diplodia calycanthi
Diplodia calycotomes
Diplodia calycotomes-villosae
Diplodia camelliae
Diplodia camelliaecola
Diplodia camphorae
Diplodia canthiifolia
Diplodia capparis
Diplodia caraganae
Diplodia caricae
Diplodia caricina
Diplodia carissae
Diplodia carpini
Diplodia carpinicola
Diplodia carpogena
Diplodia carpophila
Diplodia caryigena
Diplodia cassiae-multijugae
Diplodia cassinopsidis
Diplodia castaneae
Diplodia catalpae
Diplodia catappae
Diplodia catappe
Diplodia catechu
Diplodia cathartocarpi
Diplodia caucasici
Diplodia caulicola
Diplodia cavanillesiana
Diplodia ceanothe
Diplodia ceanothi
Diplodia cedrelae
Diplodia celastri
Diplodia celastrina
Diplodia celottiana
Diplodia celtidigena
Diplodia celtidis
Diplodia celtigena
Diplodia centrophila
Diplodia cerasorum
Diplodia ceratocarpi
Diplodia ceratoniae
Diplodia cercidis
Diplodia cercidis-chinensis
Diplodia cerei-triangularis
Diplodia cesarorum
Diplodia chaetomioides
Diplodia chenopodii
Diplodia chimonanthi
Diplodia chionanthi
Diplodia chrysanthemella
Diplodia chrysanthemi
Diplodia ciceris
Diplodia cinchonae
Diplodia cincta
Diplodia cinnamomi
Diplodia cirsii-igniarii
Diplodia cisticola
Diplodia cistina
Diplodia citharexyli
Diplodia citri
Diplodia citricola
Diplodia citrina
Diplodia cladrastidis
Diplodia clandestina
Diplodia clavispora
Diplodia clavuligera
Diplodia clematidea
Diplodia clematidis
Diplodia cocculi
Diplodia cococarpa
Diplodia cocoina
Diplodia coffaeiphila
Diplodia coffeae
Diplodia coffeicola
Diplodia coicis
Diplodia colletiae
Diplodia coluteae
Diplodia comari
Diplodia compacta
Diplodia compressa
Diplodia confluens
Diplodia congesta
Diplodia consimilis
Diplodia consociata
Diplodia consors
Diplodia constricta
Diplodia consueloi
Diplodia convolvuli
Diplodia cookei
Diplodia corchori
Diplodia corni
Diplodia coronillae
Diplodia corticola
Diplodia corydalis
Diplodia coryli
Diplodia corylina
Diplodia coryphae
Diplodia cowdellii
Diplodia crassulae
Diplodia crebra
Diplodia croatica
Diplodia crus-galli
Diplodia crustacea
Diplodia cucurbitaceae
Diplodia culmorum
Diplodia cupressi
Diplodia cupressina
Diplodia curreyi
Diplodia cyanostroma
Diplodia cycadis
Diplodia cydoniae
Diplodia cylindrospora
Diplodia cynanchina
Diplodia cyparissa
Diplodia cytisi
Diplodia cytosporioides
Diplodia cytosporoides
Diplodia daemiae
Diplodia dalbergiae
Diplodia daturae
Diplodia dearnessii
Diplodia decorticata
Diplodia deodarae
Diplodia depazeoides
Diplodia destruens
Diplodia deutziae
Diplodia diacanthina
Diplodia dianthi
Diplodia diatrype
Diplodia diospyri
Diplodia discriminanda
Diplodia ditior
Diplodia diversa
Diplodia diversispora
Diplodia dorycnea
Diplodia dorycnii
Diplodia dracaenae
Diplodia dracaenicola
Diplodia drepanocladi
Diplodia dryadea
Diplodia dulcamarae
Diplodia durantae
Diplodia durionis
Diplodia edgworthiae
Diplodia ehretiae
Diplodia elaeagnella
Diplodia elaeagni
Diplodia elaeophila
Diplodia elaeospora
Diplodia elastica
Diplodia embryopteridis
Diplodia emeri
Diplodia ephedrae
Diplodia ephedricola
Diplodia epherdricola
Diplodia epicocos
Diplodia epilobii
Diplodia equiseti
Diplodia equisetina
Diplodia erebia
Diplodia eriobotryae
Diplodia eritrichi
Diplodia eructans
Diplodia eucalypti
Diplodia eugenioides
Diplodia euonymi
Diplodia euphorbiae
Diplodia eustaga
Diplodia euterpes
Diplodia exochordae
Diplodia extensa
Diplodia fabianae
Diplodia fabiformis
Diplodia fabriciae
Diplodia faginea
Diplodia fairmanii
Diplodia farnesiana
Diplodia fecundissima
Diplodia fibricola
Diplodia fibriseda
Diplodia ficina
Diplodia fici-religiosae
Diplodia fici-retusae
Diplodia ficophila
Diplodia fissa
Diplodia foeniculina
Diplodia foliicola
Diplodia foliorum
Diplodia forsythiae
Diplodia foucaudii
Diplodia frangulae
Diplodia fraxini
Diplodia fructigena
Diplodia fructus-pandani
Diplodia frumenti
Diplodia fuchsiae
Diplodia fulvella
Diplodia fumanae
Diplodia galactis
Diplodia galbulorum
Diplodia gales
Diplodia gali
Diplodia galii
Diplodia gayi
Diplodia genistae-tinctoriae
Diplodia genistarum
Diplodia georginae
Diplodia germanica
Diplodia gigantea
Diplodia glandicola
Diplodia gleditschiae
Diplodia globulosa
Diplodia gmelinae
Diplodia gongrogena
Diplodia gossypii
Diplodia grevilleae
Diplodia grewiae
Diplodia grossulariae
Diplodia guaranitica
Diplodia guayaci
Diplodia guineae
Diplodia gymnosporiae
Diplodia gymnosporina
Diplodia halimodendri
Diplodia halleriae
Diplodia haloxyli
Diplodia hamamelidis
Diplodia hapiopappi
Diplodia haplopappi
Diplodia harknessii
Diplodia hederae
Diplodia helianthemi
Diplodia helichrysi
Diplodia hellebori
Diplodia henriquesiana
Diplodia henriquesii
Diplodia herbarum
Diplodia herbicola
Diplodia hesperidica
Diplodia heteroclita
Diplodia heteromelina
Diplodia heteromorpha
Diplodia heterospora
Diplodia heufleri
Diplodia hibisci
Diplodia hibiscina
Diplodia hippophaëarum
Diplodia hirtella
Diplodia hortensis
Diplodia hoveniae
Diplodia humuli
Diplodia hungarica
Diplodia hurae
Diplodia hyoscyamicola
Diplodia hyperiana
Diplodia hypericina
Diplodia hypoxyloidea
Diplodia hypoxyloides
Diplodia hyssopi
Diplodia ilicicola
Diplodia ilicina
Diplodia imperialis
Diplodia incarvilleae
Diplodia inconspicua
Diplodia incrustans
Diplodia indica
Diplodia indigoferae
Diplodia infuscans
Diplodia inocarpi
Diplodia insculpta
Diplodia insitiva
Diplodia interrogativa
Diplodia intertrappea
Diplodia inulae
Diplodia ipomoeae
Diplodia ischaemi
Diplodia ivicola
Diplodia jasmini
Diplodia jasminicola
Diplodia jatrophae
Diplodia juglandina
Diplodia juglandis
Diplodia julibrisin
Diplodia juniperi
Diplodia kaki
Diplodia kalopanacis
Diplodia kansensis
Diplodia kerensis
Diplodia kernsis
Diplodia kerriae
Diplodia koelreuteriae
Diplodia kravtzevii
Diplodia lablab
Diplodia laelio-cattleyae
Diplodia lagenariae
Diplodia lagerstroemiae
Diplodia laminariana
Diplodia landolphiae
Diplodia langloisii
Diplodia lantanae
Diplodia lantanicola
Diplodia lappulae
Diplodia lata
Diplodia lathyri
Diplodia laureaia
Diplodia laureolae
Diplodia laurina
Diplodia laurocerasi
Diplodia lecanorae
Diplodia lecythea
Diplodia leguminis-cytisi
Diplodia leguminum
Diplodia leptodactyli
Diplodia leptospora
Diplodia libera
Diplodia licalis
Diplodia lichenopsis
Diplodia ligniaria
Diplodia lignicola
Diplodia ligustri
Diplodia ligustricola
Diplodia lilacis
Diplodia linariae
Diplodia linderae
Diplodia liriodendri
Diplodia litseae
Diplodia loculata
Diplodia longipedicellata
Diplodia longispora
Diplodia longloisii
Diplodia lonicerae
Diplodia lophiostomatoides
Diplodia loranthi
Diplodia lulibrissin
Diplodia lunariae
Diplodia lupini
Diplodia luteobrunnea
Diplodia lyciella
Diplodia lycii
Diplodia maclurae
Diplodia macropyrena
Diplodia macrosperma
Diplodia macrostoma
Diplodia maculans
Diplodia maculata
Diplodia maculicola
Diplodia magnoliae
Diplodia magnoliicola
Diplodia mahoniae
Diplodia malloti
Diplodia malorum
Diplodia mamillana
Diplodia mamma
Diplodia mandorae
Diplodia mandorei
Diplodia mangiferae
Diplodia manginii
Diplodia mangostanae
Diplodia manihotis
Diplodia marsdeniae
Diplodia marumiae
Diplodia maura
Diplodia maydis
Diplodia medicaginis
Diplodia megalospora
Diplodia melaena
Diplodia meliae
Diplodia menthae
Diplodia mespilana
Diplodia mespili
Diplodia mespilina
Diplodia metasequoiae
Diplodia micheliae
Diplodia microscopica
Diplodia microspora
Diplodia microsporella
Diplodia millegrana
Diplodia mimosae
Diplodia mimosae-himalayanae
Diplodia minor
Diplodia minutissima
Diplodia mitylospora
Diplodia mixta
Diplodia moelleriana
Diplodia monsterae
Diplodia mori
Diplodia moricola
Diplodia morina
Diplodia moringae
Diplodia morreniae
Diplodia muehlenbeckiae
Diplodia multicarpa
Diplodia multijugae
Diplodia musae
Diplodia muscicola
Diplodia mygindae
Diplodia myricae
Diplodia myrsines
Diplodia myxosporioides
Diplodia nanophyti
Diplodia negundinis
Diplodia nematospora
Diplodia nerii
Diplodia nigricans
Diplodia nitens
Diplodia noaeae
Diplodia novae-hollandiae
Diplodia nucis
Diplodia nutans
Diplodia nuttalliae
Diplodia obiones
Diplodia oblonga
Diplodia obsoleta
Diplodia ochromae
Diplodia ochrosiae
Diplodia oenocarpi
Diplodia oenotherae
Diplodia officinalis
Diplodia oleae
Diplodia oleandri
Diplodia olivarum
Diplodia onobrychidis
Diplodia oospora
Diplodia opuli
Diplodia opuntiae
Diplodia orae-maris
Diplodia orchidis
Diplodia organicola
Diplodia oryzae
Diplodia oryzina
Diplodia osteospora
Diplodia ostryae
Diplodia osyridella
Diplodia osyridis
Diplodia otthiana
Diplodia oudemansii
Diplodia oxalidis
Diplodia oxylobii
Diplodia oxystelmatis
Diplodia padi
Diplodia padina
Diplodia palinarum
Diplodia paliuri
Diplodia palmarum
Diplodia palmicola
Diplodia pamirica
Diplodia panacis
Diplodia pandani
Diplodia papayae
Diplodia papillosa
Diplodia pappiana
Diplodia paradisiaca
Diplodia paraphysaria
Diplodia paraphysata
Diplodia parkinsoniae
Diplodia passeriniana
Diplodia passiflorae
Diplodia passifloricola
Diplodia patellaris
Diplodia paulowniae
Diplodia paupercula
Diplodia pedilanthi
Diplodia pellica
Diplodia pentatropidis
Diplodia periglandis
Diplodia periplocae
Diplodia peristrophes
Diplodia perseana
Diplodia persicae
Diplodia persicina
Diplodia petiolaris
Diplodia petiolorum
Diplodia phaseolina
Diplodia phellodendri
Diplodia philadelphi
Diplodia phillyreae
Diplodia philodendri
Diplodia phloeospora
Diplodia phoenicicola
Diplodia phoradendri
Diplodia phormicola
Diplodia photiniae
Diplodia photiniicola
Diplodia phyllactinia
Diplodia phyllactiniae
Diplodia phyllarthri
Diplodia phyllodii
Diplodia phyllodiorum
Diplodia phyllostictae
Diplodia pinnarum
Diplodia piriformis
Diplodia pistaciae
Diplodia pithecellobii
Diplodia plantani
Diplodia plantanicola
Diplodia platani
Diplodia platanicola
Diplodia plumbaginis
Diplodia pollacciana
Diplodia polyalthicola
Diplodia polygoni
Diplodia polygoni-baldschuanici
Diplodia polygoni-bucharici
Diplodia polygonicola
Diplodia polymorpha
Diplodia populina
Diplodia porlieriae
Diplodia possifloricola
Diplodia potentillae
Diplodia poterii
Diplodia preussii
Diplodia profusa
Diplodia prosopidina
Diplodia pruni
Diplodia prunicola
Diplodia pseudodiplodia
Diplodia pseudoseriata
Diplodia pseudosphaeropsis
Diplodia psidii
Diplodia psoraleae
Diplodia pteleae
Diplodia pterocarpi
Diplodia pterocaryae
Diplodia pterophila
Diplodia punctata
Diplodia punctifolia
Diplodia punctipetiola
Diplodia punicae
Diplodia pusilla
Diplodia pustulata
Diplodia pustulosa
Diplodia pyrenophora
Diplodia pyricola
Diplodia quercella
Diplodia rabatica
Diplodia radicalis
Diplodia radicicola
Diplodia radicina
Diplodia radiciperda
Diplodia radula
Diplodia ramulicola
Diplodia rapax
Diplodia ravenelii
Diplodia recifensis
Diplodia rehmii
Diplodia resurgens
Diplodia rhamni
Diplodia rhamni-alaterni
Diplodia rheae
Diplodia rhizogena
Diplodia rhizophila
Diplodia rhodocarpa
Diplodia rhododendri
Diplodia rhodophila
Diplodia rhodotypi
Diplodia rhoina
Diplodia rhois
Diplodia rhosaecarpa
Diplodia ribis
Diplodia ricinella
Diplodia ricini
Diplodia robiniae
Diplodia rodei
Diplodia rosae
Diplodia rosaecarpa
Diplodia rosarum
Diplodia rosmarini
Diplodia rosulata
Diplodia roumeguerei
Diplodia rubi
Diplodia rubicola
Diplodia ruborum
Diplodia rudis
Diplodia rumicina
Diplodia rusci
Diplodia rutae
Diplodia ruticola
Diplodia saccharicola
Diplodia saccharina
Diplodia sacchari-spontanei
Diplodia sahnii
Diplodia salicella
Diplodia salicina
Diplodia salicis
Diplodia salicorniae
Diplodia salsolae
Diplodia salvadorina
Diplodia salviae
Diplodia sambuci
Diplodia sambucicola
Diplodia sambucina
Diplodia sansevieriae
Diplodia sapii
Diplodia sarajevensis
Diplodia sarmentorum
Diplodia sarocococcae
Diplodia sarothamni
Diplodia sassafras
Diplodia saxauli
Diplodia scabra
Diplodia scabrosa
Diplodia scheidweileri
Diplodia sclerotiorum
Diplodia scoparii
Diplodia scorzonerae
Diplodia scrobiculata De Wet et al., 2003
Diplodia seaforthiae
Diplodia secalis
Diplodia sedicola
Diplodia segapelii
Diplodia segapelli
Diplodia seminula
Diplodia seriata
Diplodia shearii
Diplodia sicula
Diplodia sidae
Diplodia sideritidis
Diplodia siliquastri
Diplodia silybi-mariani
Diplodia simmonsii
Diplodia siphonis
Diplodia sipolisiae
Diplodia smilacella
Diplodia smilacina
Diplodia solani
Diplodia solanicola
Diplodia sophorae
Diplodia sorbi
Diplodia sparsa
Diplodia spartii
Diplodia spegazziniana
Diplodia sphaerospora
Diplodia spinulosae
Diplodia spiraeae
Diplodia spiraeicola
Diplodia spiraeina
Diplodia spurca
Diplodia stachydis
Diplodia stangeriae
Diplodia staphyleae
Diplodia stenocarpi
Diplodia stenospora
Diplodia sterculiae
Diplodia stevenii
Diplodia striata
Diplodia styracis
Diplodia subcuticularis
Diplodia suberina
Diplodia subglobata
Diplodia subseriata
Diplodia subsolitaria
Diplodia subtecta
Diplodia subtectoides
Diplodia subterranea
Diplodia subtilis
Diplodia suttonii
Diplodia sycina
Diplodia syconophila
Diplodia sydowiana
Diplodia symphoricarpi
Diplodia synedrellae
Diplodia syriaca
Diplodia syringae
Diplodia tagetis-erectae
Diplodia tamaricina
Diplodia tamarindica
Diplodia tanaceti
Diplodia tarentina
Diplodia tassiana
Diplodia taxi
Diplodia tecomae
Diplodia tecomiae
Diplodia tecta
Diplodia tenuis
Diplodia tephrostoma
Diplodia teucrii
Diplodia thalassia
Diplodia thalictri
Diplodia thalictricola
Diplodia theae-sinensis
Diplodia thesii
Diplodia thevetiae
Diplodia thujae
Diplodia thujana
Diplodia thymelaeae
Diplodia thymeteae
Diplodia thymi
Diplodia thyoidea
Diplodia tiliae
Diplodia tini
Diplodia togashiana
Diplodia torreyae
Diplodia torreyae-californicae
Diplodia trachelospermi
Diplodia tragiae
Diplodia traversiana
Diplodia trevoae
Diplodia trichini
Diplodia trichinii
Diplodia truncata
Diplodia tulipiferae
Diplodia tumefaciens
Diplodia tylostomatis
Diplodia typhina
Diplodia ulcinjensis
Diplodia ulicis
Diplodia ulmi
Diplodia umbellulariae
Diplodia unedinis
Diplodia unedonis
Diplodia uredinicola
Diplodia ureniana
Diplodia uvariae
Diplodia uvicola
Diplodia uvulariae
Diplodia vaccinii
Diplodia valsoides
Diplodia variispora
Diplodia veratri
Diplodia verbenacea
Diplodia veronensis
Diplodia veronicae
Diplodia viburnicola
Diplodia viciae
Diplodia vignae
Diplodia vincae
Diplodia vincaecola
Diplodia vineae
Diplodia virginiana
Diplodia viscicola
Diplodia vulgaris
Diplodia warburgiana
Diplodia watsoniana
Diplodia weigelae
Diplodia weyhei
Diplodia wisteriae
Diplodia withaniae
Diplodia wurthii
Diplodia xanthii
Diplodia xanthoceratis
Diplodia yerbae
Diplodia yuccae
Diplodia zanthoxyli
Diplodia zebrina
Diplodia zeicola
Diplodia zeylanica
Diplodia ziziphina
Diplodia zygophylli

References

External links 
 Index Fungorum

Botryosphaeriaceae
Dothideomycetes genera
Taxa named by Elias Magnus Fries
Taxa described in 1834